Sob Rock is the eighth studio album by American singer-songwriter John Mayer, released on July 16, 2021, by Columbia Records. The single "New Light", released in May 2018, is included on the album, as are Mayer's two singles from 2019, "I Guess I Just Feel Like" and "Carry Me Away". The lead single "Last Train Home" was released on June 4, 2021, and features guest vocals from Maren Morris. Mayer toured the United States with Dead & Company from August through October 2021 and embarked on a solo tour in support of the album in 2022.

Background
Mayer has stated that this album was mostly born out of the COVID-19 pandemic, with most of the songs on the album resulting from the time after March 2020 when touring was shut down for many artists. Mayer's goal was to work on a 10-track album that paid homage to the songs he heard in his childhood growing up in the 80s. Mayer said that the idea of this album was meant to "confuse the listeners" and "implant false memories." He also stated in an interview with Zane Lowe that the record was meant to be a shitpost, trying to go against everything he had released up to that point.

Mayer also decided that three of his previous singles were also going to be on the album when it released. These singles ("New Light", "I Guess I Just Feel Like", and "Carry Me Away") had all been released in the time from mid-2018 to late 2019 and were not originally intended to be on an album.

Initially, Mayer claimed that the album was to be released in mid-April 2021. However he later announced the delay of the record to July 16. It was recorded between late 2017 and early 2021. Mayer released "Last Train Home" as a single on June 4, 2021. Before that, clips of the track were released onto Mayer's TikTok account in late March 2021. It was also announced that the album was to be released on physical formats, adding different vinyl and cassette editions.

Promotion
In addition to Mayer himself creating a TikTok account, Columbia Records also pushed a marketing campaign revolving around a 1980s advertising aesthetic. A couple months before the album released or was even formally announced, posters appeared in various locations in cities around the world. They all described the sound of Sob Rock but never explicitly confirmed ties with Mayer releasing an album. A site called sobrock.net went up around the same time, with a newsletter sign up and a copyright for "John Mayer Enterprises". 

On June 1, 2021, Mayer finally confirmed that his new album was indeed called Sob Rock, and additionally gave the release date and cover. From there, Columbia went public and posted 1980s themed billboards and posters to promote the album and single, "Last Train Home". Those who had previously signed up for the website newsletter received a zine focused around the album in the mail.

After "Last Train Home" was released, Mayer released a music video for the single and then performed the song on Jimmy Kimmel Live! on June 7, 2021.

When the album was officially released, Mayer went on The Tonight Show Starring Jimmy Fallon and performed the songs "Shouldn't Matter but It Does" and "Last Train Home". The day after this he confirmed numerous tour dates across America for a Sob Rock Tour in 2022.

Mayer further went on to release "Wild Blue" as a single, which received an accompanying music video on August 18, 2021.

Critical reception

Sob Rock received generally positive reviews from music critics. At Metacritic, which assigns a normalized rating out of 100 to reviews from mainstream critics, the album has an average score of 70 based on 9 reviews, indicating "generally favorable" reception.

It was elected by Guitar Worlds readers as the best guitar album of 2021. Jon Caramanica of The New York Times wrote that the record draws on 1980's nostalgia to sell new collectables from John Mayer.

Track listing

Personnel
Adapted from album's liner notes.

Musicians
John Mayer – vocals, guitars, keyboards , piano , bass 
Aaron Sterling – drums, percussion 
Greg Phillinganes – keyboards , synthesizers 
Sean Hurley – bass 
Lenny Castro – percussion 
Maren Morris – vocals 
Pino Palladino – bass 
Jeff Babko – keyboards 
Larry Goldings – keyboards 
Greg Leisz – pedal steel guitar 
Jamie Muhoberac – keyboards 
Cautious Clay – vocals

Production
John Mayer – producer
Don Was – producer 
No I.D. – producer 
Chad Franscoviak – co-producer , engineer 
Curt Schneider – engineer 
Chenao Wang – assistant engineer
Matt Tuggle – assistant engineer 
Ryan Lytle – assistant engineer 
Mark "Spike" Stent – mixing
Matt Wolach – mix assistant
Michael Freeman – mix assistant 
Martin Pradler – digital editing
Randy Merrill – mastering
Ryan Del Vecchio – mastering assistant

Charts

Weekly charts

Year-end charts

Certifications

References

2021 albums
John Mayer albums
Columbia Records albums
Albums produced by Don Was
Albums produced by No I.D.
Albums impacted by the COVID-19 pandemic
Albums postponed due to the COVID-19 pandemic